Harry Grossmiller (March 9, 1910 – July 20, 1945) was an American rower. He competed in the men's coxed four event at the 1932 Summer Olympics.

References

1910 births
1945 deaths
American male rowers
Olympic rowers of the United States
Rowers at the 1932 Summer Olympics
Sportspeople from Atlantic City, New Jersey